Emily Lloyd-Saini is a British comedian, actress, broadcaster and writer from Nottingham. She is known for her comedy duo EGG, with Anna Leong Brophy.

Career
Lloyd-Saini is a graduate of the Oxford School of Drama under George Peck. She was a finalist of Funny Women in 2011.

In January 2017, Lloyd-Saini began a weekly show with Mawaan Rizwan on the BBC Asian Network.
As part of sketch duo EGG (with Anna Leong Brophy) she performed at the Edinburgh Fringe in 2018. She was a cast member in ITV2's Buffering, and played DI Ryle in Sky One's Code 404. She was a panellist on BBC Two's Mock The Week in December 2021.

In November 2022 she appeared opposite Kristen Bell as "Moffy" in the Amazon film, The People We Hate At The Wedding.

References

External links

Actors from Nottingham
English stand-up comedians
British sketch comedians
21st-century British actresses
Living people

Year of birth missing (living people)